"Bad Boy" is a song written and recorded by American R&B musician Larry Williams. Specialty Records released it as a single in 1958, but it failed to reach the U.S. Billboard charts. However, music journalist Stephen Thomas Erlewine calls it one of Williams's "genuine rock & roll classics" and notes its popularity among 1960s British Invasion groups, such as the Beatles.

Original song
Williams was among the early rhythm and blues artists to adapt his style to the new rock and roll sound.  The lyrics reflect a teenage sensibility: "He's a guy who causes trouble in the classroom, puts chewing gum in little girls' hair, and doesn't want to go to school to learn to read and write", according to critic Richie Unterberger. Musically, he calls it:

Music writer Gene Sculatti compares it to Williams's earlier song "Dizzy, Miss Lizzy", but with backup vocals more like the Coasters "Charlie Brown" and the Everly Brothers "Bird Dog", both Billboard chart hits.

Personnel
The song was recorded at Radio Recorders in Hollywood, California, on August 14, 1958, by:
Larry Williamsvocals, piano
René Hallguitar
Ted Brinsonbass
Earl Palmerdrums
Jewell Grantbaritone sax
Plas Johnsontenor sax

The Beatles version

"Bad Boy" is one of several Larry Williams songs the English rock band the Beatles recorded during their career. They recorded it on May 10, 1965, (Williams' birthday), along with Williams' "Dizzy, Miss Lizzy," and was originally intended solely for release in North America. "Bad Boy" was first released on the American album Beatles VI in June 1965, while "Dizzy, Miss Lizzy" appeared on the British Help! album in August of that year. "Bad Boy" was eventually released in the UK on the compilation album A Collection of Beatles Oldies, in December 1966; it was later released worldwide on the 1988 compilation album Past Masters, Volume One, as well as its 2009 reissue, Past Masters, which combines both volumes.

The song was released as the title track of an EP in Sweden together with "Norwegian Wood (This Bird Has Flown)", "I'm Looking Through You" and "In My Life". This EP sold so well that "Bad Boy" reached numbers seven on the country's sales chart, Kvällstoppen and five on the radio chart Tio i Topp in December 1966.

References

1959 songs
1959 singles
Larry Williams songs
The Beatles songs
Song recordings produced by George Martin
Songs written by Larry Williams
Specialty Records singles